Vittorio Duse (21 March 1916 – 2 June 2005) was an Italian actor, screenwriter and film director.

Biography
One of Duse's first roles was in Luchino Visconti's debut feature Ossessione (1942). Outside Italy, Duse is known for his role in The Godfather Part III as Don Tommasino in 1990, replacing Corrado Gaipa, who died one year prior to the film's release. Duse mostly starred in Italian films, although he also appeared in The Young Indiana Jones Chronicles, The Sopranos, and in When in Rome.

In 1989, Duse starred in the film Queen of Hearts, and he won the Jury Distinction Award at the Montréal World Film Festival.

Death
Duse died on 2 June 2005 at the age of 89.

Selected filmography

 Il cavaliere senza nome (1941)
 Girl of the Golden West (1942)
 Il leone di Damasco (1942)
 Giarabub (1942) - Un giocatore di carte
 Redenzione (1943)
 Il treno crociato (1943) - Sallustri (uncredited)
 Ossessione (1943) - L'agente di polizia
 T'amerò sempre (1943) - Il fidanzato di Clelia (uncredited)
 Two Anonymous Letters (1945) - Ettore
 The Sun Still Rises (1946) - Cesare
 Inquietudine (1946) - Pietro
 Tragic Hunt (1947) - Giuseppe
 Uomini senza domani (1948)
 Il cavaliere misterioso (1948)
 Guarany (1948)
 The Earth Cries Out (1949)
 La figlia della Madonna (1949)
 The Walls of Malapaga (1949) - L'agent / l'agente
 Torna a Napoli (1949) - Mario
 Notte di nebbia (1949)
 Le due madonne (1949)
 Altura (1949)
 Il sentiero dell'odio (1950)
 I'm the Capataz (1951) - Puchero
 Attention! Bandits! (1951) - Domenico
 Santa Lucia Luntana (1951)
 Salvate mia figlia (1951)
 Infame accusa (1952)
 Addio, figlio mio! (1953) - Il levantino, capo della banda
 Empty Eyes (1953) - Evasio, butler (uncredited)
 Frine, Courtesan of Orient (1953) - Ufficiale che trova la collana
 Terra straniera (1954) 
 La peccatrice dell'isola (1954) - Ispettore de Santis
 Disonorata (senza colpa) (1954) - Sergio Vosulich
 Via Padova 46 (1954) - Policeman at the Airport (uncredited)
 Ultima illusione (1954)
 Il seduttore (1954) - Dante (uncredited)
 Disowned (1954) - Filippo
 Un giglio infranto (1956) - Il conte Zimmer
 A vent'anni è sempre festa (1957) - Piani
 The Loves of Salammbo (1960)
 A Man for Burning (1962) - Bastiano
 Odio mortale (1962) - Guercio
 A Girl... and a Million (1962) - Policeman at the studio (uncredited)
 Tempo di Roma (1962)
 The Leopard (1963)
 The Possessed (1965)
 Two Sergeants of General Custer (1965)
 I Knew Her Well (1965) - Guest at Paganelli's (uncredited)
 Requiescant (1967) - El Doblado
 Lo straniero (1967) - Lawyer
 Galileo (1968)
 Investigation of a Citizen Above Suspicion (1970) - Canes
 Lettera aperta a un giornale della sera (1970) - Butler
 Let's Have a Riot (1970) - Morelli
 The Syndicate: A Death in the Family (1970) - Mac Brown
 Corbari (1970) - Martino
 Un apprezzato professionista di sicuro avvenire (1971) - Father of Marco
 Alfredo, Alfredo (1972) - Giudice
 The Assassin of Rome (1972) - Director of 'Messaggero'
 Black Turin (1972) - Camarata
 Don Camillo e i giovani d'oggi (1972)
 Il caso Pisciotta (1972) - Il cappellano
 Amore e morte nel giardino degli dei (1972)
 Flatfoot (1973) - Police officer
 City Under Siege (1974) - Ragusa
 Il bacio di una morta (1974) - Cemetery caretaker
 Ready for Anything (1977) - The Butler
 Il prefetto di ferro (1977)
 Beast with a Gun (1977) - Caroli
 La bravata (1977)
 Queen of Hearts (1989) - Nonno
 The Godfather Part III (1990) - Don Tommasino
 Enchanted April (1991) - Domenico
 Il tempo del ritorno (1993)
 The Mysterious Enchanter (1996) - Father Medelana
 Ecco fatto (1998) - Man at laundrette
 Fate un bel sorriso (2000)
 When in Rome (2002) - Paolo's Grandfather (final film role)

References

External links

1916 births
2005 deaths
Italian male film actors
Italian male television actors
Italian male stage actors
Italian male screenwriters
Italian film directors
20th-century Italian male actors
Centro Sperimentale di Cinematografia alumni
20th-century Italian screenwriters
20th-century Italian male writers